John Hayres (born 11 April 1938) is an Australian former swimmer. He competed in the men's 100 metre backstroke at the 1956 Summer Olympics.

References

External links
 

1938 births
Living people
Australian male backstroke swimmers
Olympic swimmers of Australia
Swimmers at the 1956 Summer Olympics
Place of birth missing (living people)
Commonwealth Games medallists in swimming
Commonwealth Games silver medallists for Australia
Swimmers at the 1958 British Empire and Commonwealth Games
20th-century Australian people
Medallists at the 1958 British Empire and Commonwealth Games